The Savage Tide Adventure Path (or simply Savage Tide) is the third Adventure Path for the Dungeons & Dragons role-playing game, published over twelve installments from October 2006 through September 2007 in Dungeon magazine. It begins in the city of Sasserine, just north of the city of Cauldron, which serves as the setting for the first Adventure Path, Shackled City.

Story 
From the June 2006 promotional announcement in Dungeon Adventures:
[T]he Savage Tide Adventure Path [is] a 12-installment campaign designed to take characters from the heady days of first level all the way to the responsibilities of level 20. Running every month from issue #139 to the milestone Dungeon #150, the Savage Tide takes players on an ocean voyage that begins in the fecund southern jungles and leads deep into the heart of the treacherous Lower Planes.

Setting 
The story nominally takes place in the Greyhawk campaign setting, but is designed to be easily adapted to any of the other Dungeons & Dragons settings such as Forgotten Realms or Eberron. Much of the action is staged on the Isle of Dread, and Dungeon editor Erik Mona stated that, partially because of this, the campaign would contain a number of Mystara references, including specific monsters which had not previously appeared in the then-current edition of Dungeons & Dragons.

Summary 
The campaign begins in the city of Sasserine and nearby environs, where the party discovers the first clues about an impending disaster called the Savage Tide. The action then moves to the Isle of Dread for the middle portion of the series, and the party must deal with the dangers of the island and unearth more information about the Savage Tide. After a short stop in the depraved pirate city of Scuttlecove, the final third of the campaign takes place in the Abyss, where the party must find a way to stop the Savage Tide and confront its architect.

The Savage Tide Adventure Path consists of the following installments:

References 

Dungeon Adventure Paths
Greyhawk modules